Francis Heselton Helme (26 August 1899 – 11 May 1984) was a Liberal party member of the House of Commons of Canada. He was born in Liverpool, England and came to Canada in 1908. He became an agent and dealer for International Harvester.

He was first elected to Parliament at the Prince Albert riding in the 1949 general election. He defeated the CCF Member for Prince Albert, Edward LeRoy Bowerman, who had in 1945 defeated then Prime Minister William Lyon Mackenzie King.  After serving in the 21st Canadian Parliament, Helme did not seek another federal term in the 1953 election. He died of heart disease in Vancouver, British Columbia in 1984.

Electoral record

References

External links
 

1899 births
1984 deaths
Members of the House of Commons of Canada from Saskatchewan
Liberal Party of Canada MPs